A blooming onion, also called onion bloom, onion blossom, onion flower, bloomin' onion, Australian onion or onion mum, is a dish consisting of one large onion, cut to resemble a flower (after it has expanded while soaking in ice water), battered, and deep-fried, often served with dipping sauce. It is served as an appetizer at some restaurants.

History
References to an "onion mum" consisting of an onion cut into the shape of a flower date as far back as 1947, though this dish did not fry or cook the onion. The more popular fried version of the dish was likely invented in 1985 at New Orleans restaurant Russell's Marina Grill, where future Outback Steakhouse founder Tim Gannon worked at the time. 

The dish was popularized in the United States when it appeared as "Bloomin' Onion", a charter feature of the Outback Steakhouse when that national chain opened in 1988. It is usually served with a restaurant-specific signature dipping sauce.

From June 21, 2016, Outback Steakhouse began serving a limited time only variant of the Bloomin' Onion, the Loaded Bloomin' Onion.

Nutrition
The egg wash and deep frying preparation process of the dish means it is high in calories; a single blooming onion with dressing contains approximately 1660 calories and 87 grams of fat. In 2007, a study by the Center for Science in the Public Interest found a fat content of 116 grams, including a combined 44 grams of saturated and trans fat.

When it existed, the similarly styled Awesome Blossom at Chili's was ranked "Worst Appetizer in America" by Men's Health magazine in 2008 for the unusually high totals of calories and fat, with 2,710 calories, 203 grams (1,827 calories) of fat, 194 grams of carbohydrates, and 6,360 milligrams of sodium, with as much fat as 67 strips of bacon. For reference, the U.S. Reference Daily Intake for fat is 65g and for sodium is 2300 mg, assuming a 2000-calorie diet, while typical daily food energy recommendations lie in the range of 1600-3000 calories.

See also

Onion ring
French fries
 List of hors d'oeuvre
 List of onion dishes

References

External links 

Onion-based foods
Appetizers
Deep fried foods
Cuisine of the Southern United States
American vegetable dishes